Epilacydes pseudoscita is a moth of the family Erebidae. It was described by Vladimir Viktorovitch Dubatolov in 2006 and is endemic to Ivory Coast.

References

External links

Endemic fauna of Ivory Coast
Spilosomina
Moths described in 2006
Moths of Africa